Normichthys is a genus of tubeshoulder fish, named for the ichthyologist John Roxborough Norman.

Species
There are currently three recognized species in this genus:
 Normichthys herringi Sazonov & Merrett, 2001
 Normichthys operosus A. E. Parr, 1951 (Multipore searsid)
 Normichthys yahganorum Lavenberg, 1965

References

Platytroctidae
Ray-finned fish genera